Agusan del Sur's 2nd congressional district is the congressional district of the Philippines in Agusan del Sur. It has been represented in the House of Representatives of the Philippines since 2010. Previously included in Agusan del Sur's 2nd congressional district from 1987 to 2010, it encompasses the southern part of the province, bordering the Davao Region. It is currently represented in the 18th Congress by Eddiebong Plaza of the National Unity Party.

Representation history

Election results

2010

2013

2016

2019

See also 

 Legislative districts of Agusan del Sur

References 

Congressional districts of the Philippines
Politics of Agusan del Sur
2008 establishments in the Philippines
Congressional districts of Caraga
Constituencies established in 2008